Harry Peter McNab Brown Jr. (April 30, 1917 – November 2, 1986) was an American poet, novelist and screenwriter.

Life
Born in Portland, Maine, he was educated at Harvard University, where he was friends with American poet Robert Lowell. Brown dropped out of Harvard after his sophomore year to write poetry, work at Time magazine, and he contributed to and became a sub-editor of The New Yorker.

Charles Scribner's Sons of New York published, in 1941, Brown's sustained unified poem The Poem of Bunker Hill. The 158-page poetic epic won praise for its author's literary gifts as a poet and for the timely presentation of a vital topic – young men and war. Louise Bogan from The New Yorker stated: "Brown...possesses one of the most unmistakable poetic gifts which have recently appeared. Such a talent is not only basically good from the beginning but exhibits, also from the first, all the signs of virtuosity." Also published, early in that year, was Brown's first full-length book, The End of a Decade.

From the American Revolutionary warfare of The Poem of Bunker Hill, Harry Brown went directly to modern military operations. Brown enlisted in July 1941 in the US Army Corps of Engineers where he served at Fort Belvoir, Virginia.  In 1942 he joined the staff of Yank magazine.

Brown wrote a column for the magazine under the pen name of "PFC Artie Greengroin" with a book published in 1945 of the columns under that title. Brown also wrote a play, A Sound of Hunting, that was produced on Broadway in 1946 starring Burt Lancaster and Frank Lovejoy. It was later filmed by Stanley Kramer under the title Eight Iron Men with a different cast of Bonar Colleano, Lee Marvin, and Arthur Franz in 1952, then was a 1961 television production with Peter Falk, Robert Lansing, and Sal Mineo directed by Seymour Robbie.

Brown wrote the novel A Walk in the Sun in 1944, which was made into a film of the same name in 1945. Director Lewis Milestone asked Brown to come to Hollywood as a screenwriter where he worked on films including Wake of the Red Witch (1948) and Sands of Iwo Jima (1949) both starring John Wayne, Kiss Tomorrow Goodbye (1950) starring James Cagney, A Place in the Sun (1951) (winning an Oscar) starring Elizabeth Taylor and Montgomery Clift, Eight Iron Men (1952) based on his play A Sound of Hunting and starring Lee Marvin, and Ocean's 11 (1960) starring the Rat Pack (Frank Sinatra, Dean Martin, Sammy Davis Jr., Peter Lawford and Joey Bishop). Brown also was credited for his work on the first Ocean's 11 when it was remade in 2001. He published a novel titled The Stars in Their Courses in 1960 which was made into the theatrical film El Dorado starring John Wayne, Robert Mitchum and James Caan six years later, although Brown insisted that his name be removed from the credits because he felt that the film had departed so radically from his novel, but the credit remains in the opening titles.

In the early 1960s Brown and his wife moved to Mexico, where they lived for 15 years.

Brown died from emphysema in Los Angeles in 1986.

Awards
 1938/1939 Shelley Memorial Award
 1936 The Young Poets Prize , awarded by Poetry magazine
 1937 Lloyd McKim Garrison Award
 1952 Academy Award for Best Writing, Screenplay for A Place in the Sun, (co-written with Michael Wilson)

Works

Poetry

Novels
 
 
 
 (The basis for the John Wayne film El Dorado. Brown insisted that his credit be removed, as he felt the film had so little in common with the novel.)
 
 
The screen credits in El Dorado list Harry Brown as the author of The Stars in Their Courses.

Plays

Screenplays (partial list)
 Arch of Triumph (1948), co-written with Lewis Milestone
 Wake of the Red Witch (1948) co-written with Kenneth Gamet
 Sands of Iwo Jima (1950) co-written with James Edward Grant; original story by Brown
 Kiss Tomorrow Goodbye (1950)
 The Man on the Eiffel Tower (1950)
 A Place in the Sun (1951) co-written with George Stevens
 Only the Valiant (1951) co-written with Edmund H. North
 Eight Iron Men (1952), based on his play A Sound of Hunting
 Many Rivers to Cross (1955) co-written with Guy Trosper
 The Virgin Queen (1955) co-written with Mindret Lord
 D-Day the Sixth of June (1956) co-written with Ivan Moffat
 Ocean's 11 (1960) co-written with Charles Lederer

References

1917 births
1986 deaths
20th-century American male writers
20th-century American novelists
20th-century American poets
20th-century American screenwriters
American male novelists
American male poets
American male screenwriters
Best Adapted Screenplay Academy Award winners
Deaths from emphysema
Harvard University alumni
Novelists from Maine
Screenwriters from Maine
Writers from Portland, Maine
United States Army personnel of World War II